Sir Peter Anthony Newsam (born 2 November 1928) is an English educationist and a member of the Oxford Education Society. He is also an alumnus of the University of Oxford and of the Department of Education.

Biography

Newsam was born at Gloucester, the son of William Oswald Newsam and Delphine Eugénie Lelievre. He was educated at the Dragon School and Clifton College. He then went to Queen's College, Oxford where he read Philosophy, Politics and Economics. He became a teacher, including a spell at the Dragon School from 1956 to 1958.

Newsam was chief education officer for the Inner London Education Authority from 1975 to 1981 and chairman of the Commission for Racial Equality from 1981 to 1985. He became Secretary to the Association of County Councils between 1987 and 1989.  From 1989 to 1994, he was Director of the Institute of Education, University of London, where he helped lead the building of an extension which now houses the Newsam Library. He later served as Chief Schools Adjudicator from 1999 to 2002.

Newsam authored the biography of Alec Clegg in the Oxford Dictionary of National Biography. He served on the Runnymede Trust's Commission on the Future of Multi-Ethnic Britain.
In 2011 he contributed an article for discussion by OES members entitled ‘Towards a totalitarian education system in England'''.
In 2015, he wrote a book called An Autobiography of Education''.

References

1928 births
Living people
People from Gloucester
People educated at The Dragon School
People educated at Clifton College
Alumni of The Queen's College, Oxford
Schoolteachers from Gloucestershire
English educational theorists
People associated with the UCL Institute of Education
Knights Bachelor